The 2021–22 Mercer Bears men's basketball team represented Mercer University in the 2021–22 NCAA Division I men's basketball season. The Bears, led by third-year head coach Greg Gary, played their home games at Hawkins Arena in Macon, Georgia as a member of the Southern Conference. They finished the season 16–17, 8–10 in SoCon play to finish in seventh place. They defeated Western Carolina in the first round of the SoCon tournament before losing to Furman in the quarterfinals.

Previous season
In a season limited due to the ongoing COVID-19 pandemic, the Bears finished the 2020–21 season 18–11, 8–9 in SoCon play to finish in seventh place. In the SoCon tournament, they defeated Samford, Wofford, and VMI to advance to the championship game. There they lost to UNC Greensboro.

Roster

Schedule and results

|-
!colspan=12 style=| Exhibition

|-
!colspan=12 style=| Non-conference regular season

|-
!colspan=12 style=| SoCon regular season

|-
!colspan=9 style=| SoCon tournament

Sources

References

Mercer Bears men's basketball seasons
Mercer Bears
Mercer Bears men's basketball
Mercer Bears men's basketball